Amax or AMAX may refer to:

AMAX, an American radio broadcasting certification program
Amax Engineering, a defunct Australian aircraft manufacturer based in Donvale, Victoria
American Metal Company, which became AMAX in 1957
Photosynthetic capacity (Amax)
Amax Esporte Clube, Brazilian football club

See also

 
 
 
 Alpha max (disambiguation), sometimes written "α max"
 AMEX (disambiguation)
 Max (disambiguation)